Tova Ilan (2 June 1929 – 18 March 2019) was an Israeli educator and politician. She briefly served as a member of the Knesset for Meimad between January and April 2006.

Biography
Born in Austria, Ilan made aliyah to Israel, and was involved in the Haganah. She joined kibbutz Ein Tzurim in 1951, and from 1951 until 1960, she worked with Youth Aliyah. From 1961 until 1972, she was the headmistress of Shafir Regional high school. In 1987, she established the Yaakov Herzog Centre for Jewish Studies in Ein Tzurim, and was its director until 2001, and is now its president.

For the 2003 elections, she was placed 27th on the joined Labor Party-Meimad list  (the second placed Meimad candidate after party leader Michael Melchior), but missed out on a seat when the alliance won only 19 seats. However, she entered the Knesset on 21 January 2006 as a replacement for Efi Oshaya (who had entered the Knesset three days previously as a replacement for Haim Ramon, who had left the party to join Kadima). Because the Knesset was already in recess prior to the next elections, she chose not to take her salary, and donated it to young olim.

She was not included on the party's list for the March 2006 elections, and subsequently lost her seat.

References

External links

1929 births
Austrian Jews
Austrian emigrants to Israel
Austrian educators
Austrian women educators
Israeli educators
Israeli women educators
Haganah members
Women members of the Knesset
Meimad politicians
One Israel politicians
Members of the 16th Knesset (2003–2006)
21st-century Israeli women politicians
2019 deaths